Mihovljan is the name of two villages in northern Croatia: 

 Mihovljan, Krapina-Zagorje County, located approximately 10 kilometres from Krapina
 Mihovljan, Međimurje County, a suburb of Čakovec